Taekwondo at the 2011 Pacific Games in Nouméa, New Caledonia was held on September 6–9, 2011.

Medal summary

Medal table

Men

Women

References

Taekwondo at the 2011 Pacific Games

2011 Pacific Games
Pacific Games
2011